Streptomyces narbonensis is a bacterium species from the genus of Streptomyces which has been isolated from soil in France. Streptomyces narbonensis produces narbomycin and josamycin.

See also 
 List of Streptomyces species

References

Further reading

External links
Type strain of Streptomyces narbonensis at BacDive -  the Bacterial Diversity Metadatabase	

narbonensis
Bacteria described in 1955